Fred Duncan was an Australian politician.

Frederick or Fred Duncan may also refer to:
Frederick Roy Duncan, engineer and architect
Fred Duncan (comics)
Frederick Duncan, of the Duncan baronets